Chinese windmill may refer to
 Byasa alcinous, a swallowtail butterfly native to eastern China and parts of the Himalayas
 Byasa plutonius, a swallowtail native to western China and parts of the Himalayas
 Trachycarpus fortunei, a palm tree native to central China, southern Japan, northern Burma and northern India